Hetty Burlingame Beatty (October 8, 1907 – August 20, 1971) was an American sculptor, writer of children's literature and illustrator.

Biography
Beatty was born in New Canaan, Connecticut. From 1924 until 1929 she attended the Boston Museum School.   She trained as a sculptor. Frederick W. Allen was the daily instructor at that time with Charles Grafly coming up from Philadelphia twice a month to give criticisms as head of the Sculpture Department.

Her works were exhibited nationally and won a number of awards.  A one-woman show of her sculpture and drawings was held at the Worcester Art Museum in 1941.  She also had shows at: Art Institute of Chicago, Knoedler Gallery-New York City, MacBeth Gallery-New York, Pennsylvania Academy, and the Society of Independent Artists.

In addition to being a sculptor, Beatty also took up writing and illustrating children’s books.

On October 11, 1959, she married Lewis F. Whitney, another artist.

Beatty once commented to Contemporary Authors, "I started out as a sculptor and gradually shifted over to the field of writing, becoming so absorbed in it that I devote nearly all my time to it now, along with illustration of most of my own books for children.”

Hetty Burlingame Beatty died on August 20, 1971.

Awards 
 Mrs. David Hunt Scholarship in Sculpture
 Second prize at the International Exhibition of Horses in Sculpture in New York

Authorship 

Topsy  (1947)
Little Wild Horse  (1949)
Little Owl Indian  (1951)
Bronto  (1952)
Saint Francis and the Wolf  (1953)
Droopy  (1954)
Thumps  (1955)
Bucking Horse  (1957)
Voyage of the Sea Wind  (1959)
Blitz  (1961)
Moorland Pony  (1961)
Trumper  (1963)
Bryn  (1965)
Rebel, the Reluctant Racehorse  (1968)

References

External links 
 Guide to the Hetty Burlingame Beatty papers at the University of Oregon

1907 births
1971 deaths
American children's writers
American women illustrators
American illustrators
20th-century American sculptors
People from New Canaan, Connecticut
20th-century American women artists